Guy de Maupassant wrote short stories, novels, travel accounts and poetry.

Short stories

Short stories published between 1875 and 1880 

 Boule de suif
 Coco, coco, coco frais ! 
 Jadis 
 La Main d'écorché 
 Le Donneur d'eau bénite
 Le Mariage du lieutenant Laré 

 Le Papa de Simon 
 Les Dimanches d'un bourgeois de Paris 
 Suicides 
 Sur l'eau 
 Une page d'histoire inédite

Short stories published in 1881 

 Au printemps
 En famille 
 Épaves 
 Histoire corse
 Histoire d'un chien
 Histoire d'une fille de ferme 

 La Femme de Paul 
 La Maison Tellier 
 Par un soir de printemps 
 Opinion publique
 Une aventure parisienne
 Une partie de campagne

Short stories published in 1882 

 Autres temps
 Aux champs 
 Ce cochon de Morin 
 Clair de lune – 1 
 Clair de lune – 2 
 Confessions d'une femme
 Conflits pour rire
 Conte de Noël 
 Correspondance
 En voyage
 Farce normande
 Fou?
 Histoire vraie
 L'Aveugle
  L'Enfant
 La Bécasse
 La Bûche
 La Folle 
 La Légende du Mont-Saint-Michel
 La Peur 
 La Relique 
 La Rempailleuse 

 La Roche aux Guillemots
 La Rouille 
 La Veillée
 Le Gâteau
 Le Lit
 Le Loup
 Le Pardon 
 Le Saut du berger
 Le Testament
 Le Verrou
 Le Voleur
 Le Baiser 
 Ma femme 
 Madame Baptiste 
 Mademoiselle Fifi
 Magnétisme
 Marroca
 Menuet
 Mon oncle Sosthène
 Mots d'amour
 Nuit de Noël

 Pétition d'un viveur malgré lui
 Pierrot 
 Rencontre
 Rêves
 Rouerie 
 Souvenir
 Un bandit corse
 Un coq chanta
 Un drame vrai
 Un fils
 Un million
 Un Normand 
 Un parricide 
 Un réveillon
 Un vieux 
 Une passion
 Une ruse
 Une veuve
 Vieux Objets
 Voyage de noce
 Yveline Samoris

Short stories published in 1883 

 Au bord du lit
 À cheval
 Apparition
 Auprès d'un mort
 Décoré !
 Denis
 Deux Amis
 En mer 
 En voyage (1883)
 Enragée ?
 Humble Drame
 L'Ami Joseph
 L'Ami Patience
 L'Âne
 L'Attente
 L'Aventure de Walter Schnaffs
 L'Enfant
 L'Homme-fille
 L'Odyssée d'une fille
 L'Orphelin
 La Confession

 La Confession de Théodule Sabot
 La Farce
 La Fenêtre
 La Ficelle
 La Main
 La Martine
 La Mère aux monstres
 La Moustache
 La Reine Hortense
 La Serre
 La Toux
 Le Cas de Mme Luneau
 Le Condamné à mort
 Le Mal d'André
 Le Modèle
 Le Pain maudit
 Le Père
 Le Père Judas 
 Le Père Milon
 Le Petit
 Le Remplaçant

 Le Vengeur
 Les Bijoux
 Les Caresses
 Les Sabots
 Lui?
 M. Jocaste
 Mademoiselle Cocotte
 Miss Harriet
 Mon oncle Jules
 Première neige
 Regret
 Réveil
 Saint-Antoine
 Tombouctou
 Un coup d'état
 Un duel
 Un sage
 Une soirée
 Une surprise
 Une vendetta

Short stories published in 1884 

 Adieu
 Berthe
 Bombard
 Coco
 Châli
 Découverte
 Garçon, un bock !...
 Idylle
 L'Abandonné
 L'Aveu
 L'Héritage
 L'Horrible
 La Chambre 11
 La Chevelure
 La Confession
 La Dot

 La Mère Sauvage
 La Parure
 La Patronne
 La Peur
 Le Baptême
 Le Bonheur
 Le Garde
 Le Gueux
 Le Lit 29
 Le Parapluie
 Le Protecteur
 Le Retour
 Le Tic
 Le Vieux 
 Lettre trouvée sur un noyé
 Les Idées du colonel

 Les Sœurs Rondoli
 Mohammed-Fripouille
 Misti
 Notes d'un voyageur
 Promenade
 Rencontre
 Rose
 Solitude
 Souvenirs
 Tribunaux rustiques
 Un fou ?
 Un lâche
 Une vente
 Vains Conseils
 Yvette

Short stories published in 1885 

 À vendre
 Blanc et Bleu
 Ça ira
 En wagon
 Fini
 Imprudence
 La Bête à Maît' Belhomme
 La Confidence

 Le Baptême (1885)
 Le Moyen de Roger
 Le Père Mongilet
 L'Épingle
 Les Bécasses
 Lettre d'un fou
 L'Inconnue
 Mes vingt-cinq jours

 Monsieur Parent
 Nos Anglais
 Petit Soldat
 Sauvée
 Toine
 Un échec
 Un fou
 Une lettre

Short stories published in 1886 

Amour
Au bois
Clochette
Cri d'alarme
Jour de fête
Julie Romain
La Question du latin
L'Auberge

L'Ermite
Le Diable
Le Fermier
Le Père Amable
Le Signe
Le Trou
Madame Parisse

Mademoiselle Perle
Misère humaine
Rosalie Prudent
Sur les chats
Un cas de divorce
Une famille
Voyage de santé

Short stories published in 1887 

Comment on cause
Duchoux
Étrennes
L'Assassin
L'Homme de Mars
L'Ordonnance
La Baronne

La Morte
La Nuit
La Porte
Le Horla
Le Lapin
Le Père
Le Rosier de Madame Husson

Le Vagabond
Le Voyage du Horla
Les Rois
Madame Hermet
Moiron
Une soirée (1887)

Short stories published in 1888 

Divorce
L'Infirme
Le Noyé
Les Épingles

Les 25 Francs de la supérieure
Nos lettres
Un portrait

Short stories published in 1889 

 Alexandre
 Allouma
 Boitelle
 Hautot père et fils
 L'Endormeuse
 L'Épreuve

 L'Ordonnance
 La Main gauche
 Le Masque
  Le Port
 Le Rendez-vous
 Un soir

Short stories published in 1890 
Le Champ d'oliviers
L'Inutile Beauté
Mouche
Qui sait ?

Short stories published in 1891 and posthumously 
 Après
 Le Colporteur 
 Le Docteur Héraclius Gloss
 Les Tombales

Short story collections 
 Les Soirées de Médan (with Zola, Huysmans et al. Contains Boule de Suif by Maupassant) (1880)
 La Maison Tellier (1881)
 Mademoiselle Fifi (1882)
 Contes de la bécasse (1887)
 Miss Harriet (1884)
 Les Sœurs Rondoli (1884)
 Clair de lune (1884) (contains "Les Bijoux")
 Yvette (1884)
 Toine (1885)
 Contes du jour et de la nuit (1885) (contains "La Parure" or "The Necklace")
 Monsieur Parent (1886)
 La Petite Roque (1886)
 Le Horla (1887)
 Le Rosier de Madame Husson (1888)
 La Main gauche (1889)
 L'Inutile Beauté (1890)

Novels 
 A Life (1883)
 Bel-Ami (1885)
 Mont Oriol (1887)
 Pierre et Jean (1888)
 Fort comme la mort (1889)
 Notre Cœur (1890)

Travel writing
 Au soleil (1884)
 Sur l'eau (1888)
 La Vie errante (1890)

Poetry
 Des vers (1880)

References

External links

 
 
  (plain text and HTML)
 Works by Guy de Maupassant at Online Literature (HTML)
Maupassantiana, a French Scholar Website on Maupassant and his works.
 Works by Guy de Maupassant(text, concordances and frequency list)
  Oeuvres de Maupassant, à Athena

Maupassant, Guy de
Bibliography